The discography of The Sound of Arrows, a Swedish synthpop duo composed of singer Stefan Storm and synth player Oskar Gullstrand, consists of two extended play, three singles, seven music videos and a number of other appearances.

Albums

Studio albums

Extended plays

Digital downloads

Singles

Music videos

Soundtracks 
 Song "M.A.G.I.C." was used in a television commercial for the Mitsubishi Outlander vehicle by Mitsubishi Motors.
 Song "Into the Clouds" (Fear of Tigers remix) was used in a television commercial for the Peugeot 308 in Sweden.

Remixes 
The Sound of Arrows made remixes of the following songs:

"—" indicates a remix was not released.

Remixes of The Sound of Arrows songs:
 "Nova" was remixed by Tiësto and Esben and the Witch

References

External links
 
 

Discographies of Swedish artists
Electronic music discographies
Pop music group discographies